Bathurst Street is a street in Hobart, Tasmania. The street was named by Lachlan Macquarie in honour of Henry Bathurst, 3rd Earl Bathurst.

See also

References

Streets in Hobart